Iris is a 2001 biographical drama film about novelist Iris Murdoch and her relationship with her husband John Bayley. Directed by Richard Eyre from a screenplay he co-wrote with Charles Wood, the film is based on Bayley's 1999 memoir Elegy for Iris. Judi Dench and Jim Broadbent portray Murdoch and Bayley during the later stages of their marriage, while Kate Winslet and Hugh Bonneville appear as the couple in their younger years. The film contrasts the start of their relationship, when Murdoch was an outgoing, dominant individual compared to the timid and scholarly Bayley, and their later life, when Murdoch was suffering from Alzheimer's disease and tended to by a frustrated Bayley in their North Oxford home in Charlbury Road. The beach scenes were filmed at Southwold in Suffolk, one of Murdoch's favourite haunts.

The film had its world premiere in Los Angeles on 14 December 2001, followed by a theatrical release in the United Kingdom on 18 January 2002 and in the United States on 29 March. It grossed $16 million on a $5.5 million budget and received positive reviews, with praise towards the performances. For his role as Bayley, Broadbent won Best Supporting Actor at the 74th Academy Awards, with Dench (Best Actress) and Winslet for (Best Supporting Actress) also receiving nominations.

Plot
When the young Iris Murdoch meets fellow student John Bayley at Somerville College, Oxford, he is a naive virgin easily flummoxed by her libertine spirit, arch personality, and obvious artistic talent. Decades later, little has changed and the couple keep house, with John doting on his more famous wife. When Iris begins experiencing forgetfulness and dementia, however, the devoted John struggles with hopelessness and frustration, and becomes her carer, as his wife's mind deteriorates from the ravages of Alzheimer's disease.

Cast

Reception

Review aggregator Rotten Tomatoes reported that 79% of 110 critics gave the film a positive review, with an average rating of 7.1/10. The website's critical consensus states, "A solidly constructed drama, Iris is greatly elevated by the strength of its four lead performances." Metacritic assigned the film a weighted average score of 76 out of 100, based on 30 critics, indicating "generally favorable reviews".

Awards and nominations

References

Kalpaklı, Fatma. “Representation of Old Age and Pain in Iris”, Journal of Narrative and Language Studies.
Vol. 5, No.9 (2017): December.  30.12.2017.  ISSN: 2148-4066. 65-72.    http://www.nalans.com/index.php/nalans.

External links
 
 
 
 
 Iris at Literary Fiction, BellaOnline

2001 films
2000s English-language films
2001 romantic drama films
American biographical drama films
American romantic drama films
British biographical drama films
British romantic drama films
Biographical films about philosophers
Biographical films about writers
Films scored by James Horner
Films about Alzheimer's disease
Films based on biographies
Films featuring a Best Supporting Actor Academy Award-winning performance
Films featuring a Best Supporting Actor Golden Globe winning performance
Films produced by Scott Rudin
Films set in Oxford
Films set in universities and colleges
Films directed by Richard Eyre
Films set in the University of Oxford
Films shot in Oxfordshire
Films shot at Pinewood Studios
BBC Film films
BAFTA winners (films)
2000s American films
2000s British films
Films about disability